Tom O'Halloran is an Australian climber. He qualified for the 2020 Summer Olympics by winning the combined men's format in the 2020 IFSC Oceania Championships.

O'Halloran finished twentieth in the Qualification round, his best effort being placed seventeenth for speed. He therefore did not compete in the finals. Detailed results are in Australia at the 2020 Summer Olympics.

O'Halloran is primarily an outdoor climber, but decided to come out of competition retirement in an attempt to make the Olympic team. An accomplished lead climber, he has bolted many of Australia's hardest routes. In 2017 he climbed The Wheel of Life, a V15 boulder problem.

O'Halloran is also notable for competing on two seasons of Australian Ninja Warrior.

References

Australian rock climbers
Summer Olympics competitors for Australia
Australian Ninja Warrior contestants
Sport climbers at the 2020 Summer Olympics
1992 births
Living people
Olympic sport climbers of Australia